Eodromeus is an extinct genus of false ground beetle in the family Trachypachidae. There are about nine described species in Eodromeus.

Species
These nine species belong to the genus Eodromeus:
 † Eodromeus antiquus Ponomarenko, 1977
 † Eodromeus daohugouensis Wang & Zhang&Ponomarenko, 2012
 † Eodromeus dissectus Ponomarenko, 1977
 † Eodromeus major Ponomarenko, 1977
 † Eodromeus mongolicus Ponomarenko, 1989
 † Eodromeus robustus Wang & Zhang&Ponomarenko, 2012
 † Eodromeus sternalis Ponomarenko, 1977
 † Eodromeus sulcatus Ponomarenko, 1989
 † Eodromeus viriosus Zhang, 1997

References

Prehistoric beetle genera
Articles created by Qbugbot